Syssymmoca is a moth genus in the family Autostichidae. It contains the species Syssymmoca sahib, which is found in Iran.

References

Symmocinae